Canuleia may refer to:

 Canuleia gens, an ancient Roman family
 lex Canuleia, a law of Ancient Rome
 Gaius Canuleius, who proposed the law
 Canuleia (priestess), a Vestal Virgin
 Libythea narina canuleia, a subspecies of butterfly of the species Libythea narina
 Canuleia (crater), a crater on 4 Vesta, see List of geological features on Vesta